Catherine Blaiklock (born April 1963) is an English financial trader and hotelier who was the founder and first leader of the Brexit Party, a political party established in January 2019 to support a no-deal Brexit. She was forced to resign as leader in March 2019 when it was disclosed she had made anti-Islamic and racist statements online. Blaiklock had been the Economics Spokesperson for the UK Independence Party (UKIP), which she left in late 2018. Before entering politics in 2016, she worked as a financial currency and derivatives trader. She also founded a Nepali healthcare charity with her ex-husband, an Everest Sherpa. Her father is polar explorer Ken Blaiklock.

Early life
Blaiklock entered Christ Church, Oxford on a scholarship in 1981, the second year the College admitted women. She studied geography and climatology. She then went to India on a Commonwealth Scholarship.

Professional career
Blaiklock worked as a financial currency and derivatives trader with Merrill Lynch and other investment banks, and was located in New York, Tokyo and Singapore. She returned to Asia and founded a health care charity in Nepal, called Nepal in Need, with her then-husband Gyaljen Sherpa, with which she is still involved, and for which she continues to raise funds. Since returning to Norfolk in 1999, she has run a guest-house and other small businesses in the local hospitality sector.

Political career

UKIP (2014–2018)
Blaiklock joined UKIP in 2014, having never voted before, and said that she only really entered politics after the 2016 United Kingdom European Union membership referendum. She was the unsuccessful UKIP candidate for Great Yarmouth in the 2017 general election. During the campaign, she produced photographs of her British Jamaican husband to argue that UKIP was not racist. In September 2018, she was appointed the Economic Spokesman of UKIP, was the Eastern Regional Chair, and wrote articles for UKIP in The Daily Telegraph. Blaiklock left UKIP in 2018 when Gerard Batten appointed the English Defence League's Tommy Robinson as a personal advisor.

Brexit Party (January–July 2019)
On 20 January 2019, Blaiklock launched a pro-Brexit political party called the Brexit Party, and listed her Norfolk guest house as the headquarters. She immediately outlined her desire for former UKIP leader Nigel Farage to lead her new Brexit Party, and on 8 February 2019, Farage announced he would be a candidate for the Brexit Party in any upcoming European Parliament elections. In a 27 February interview, Reuters said: "Blaiklock wants Britain to leave the EU without a trade deal and says the threat of economic damage from a potentially disorderly no-deal Brexit has been vastly exaggerated".

On 20 March, Blaiklock resigned as party leader after The Guardian enquired about deleted anti-Islam messages from her Twitter account from before she took on the role. Her deleted tweets were recovered by the advocacy group, Hope not Hate. They included comments such as "Islam = submission – mostly to raping men it seems" and "8 people waiting for lift, 5 Muslim girls, 1 black, 1 other Asian Chinese, 1 white. Immediately outside saw a drug deal take place. Looked like Turkey."  Nigel Farage, leader of the Brexit party, described her comments about Islam as "horrible and intolerant". In May, The Guardian reported that Blaiklock still remained as a Director of the Brexit Party.

Attempt to join Conservative Party (August 2019)
Blaiklock applied to join the Conservative Party on 23 July, the day of Boris Johnson's victory in the 2019 Conservative Party leadership election, and received a membership number on 6 August. However, a few days after her public disclosure of her application, the Conservative Party, who said her application was subject to final approval, rejected her application, with Blaiklock saying: "And it was central office who cancelled it even though the local branch knows who I am".

English Democrats (2021–present)
On 3 July 2021 in The Salisbury Review, Blaiklock announced she had joined the English Democrats. She spoke at their autumn conference that year, and  following the stabbing death of Southend West's previous member of Parliament, Sir David Amess, in Leigh-on-Sea on 15 October, they subsequently nominated her in early January 2022 to stand for them at the constituency's by-election, held on 3 February. Labour, the Liberal Democrats, the Greens and other mainstream political parties chose not to contest the seat out of respect, and Blaiklock came fourth with only 320 votes (2.15%).

Views
Blaiklock has been criticised for articles she posted on The Conservative Woman where she discussed introducing hanging for drug dealers and argued that food banks are contributing to obesity in low-income families, who should be eating potatoes, being cheaper and healthier. She has also been noted for her anti-Islam statements written on a range of conservative websites.

In January 2019, The Guardian reported that, in blogs and tweets since deleted, she had "argued crime and fatherlessness among black men are due to high testosterone levels, and suggested their lower academic achievement could have a biological basis".

Personal life
Blaiklock is the daughter of explorer Ken Blaiklock, who moved his family to Norfolk when she was three months old, from where Blaiklock was raised until college. Blaiklock says she detested growing up in Norfolk, describing it as "intellectually devoid".  As a teenager she spent four years in care homes because she had bulimia and her parents found her "wayward and difficult". Blaiklock’s first husband was a Nepali called Gyaljen Sherpa whom she met in 1997 at Everest base camp, and with whom she has two children. Her second husband is a British Jamaican, Christopher Kirkpatrick.

, Blaiklock continues to run a guest house from her home in Lingwood in Norfolk called The Annapurna Guest House. Her husband manages the guest house on a day-to-day basis, and the BBC reported that its Tripadvisor page has been the subject of politically motivated attacks and "malicious trolling", requiring intervention by Tripadvisor.

See also
2019 European Parliament election in the United Kingdom
Leader of the Brexit Party

Notes

References

External links
Official website (archive)

1963 births
Living people
Leaders of political parties in the United Kingdom
British women in politics
UK Independence Party parliamentary candidates
Merrill (company) people
People from Broadland (district)
Alumni of Christ Church, Oxford
British political party founders
Reform UK politicians
British critics of Islam
English Democrats politicians